Forest Hill is an unincorporated community in Jackson Township, Decatur County, Indiana.

History
Forest Hill was laid out in 1852. It was named from the forest at the original town site. The Forest Hill post office was discontinued in 1904.

Geography

References

Unincorporated communities in Decatur County, Indiana
Unincorporated communities in Indiana